Carlos Enríquez (1898–1971) was an Uruguayan-born actor who worked primarily in Argentina. He starred in the 1950 film Arroz con leche under director Carlos Schlieper.

Selected filmography
 The Boys Didn't Wear Hair Gel Before (1937)
 A Woman of No Importance (1945)

References

External links
 
 

Uruguayan male film actors
Uruguayan expatriate actors in Argentina
Expatriate male actors in Argentina
1898 births
1971 deaths